Calyptridium quadripetalum, synonym Cistanthe quadripetala, is a species of flowering plant in the family Montiaceae. It is known by the common name four-petalled pussypaws. It is endemic to the North Coast Ranges of California, where it is an uncommon member of the serpentine soils flora on the slopes. It is a small annual plant spreading or erect stems each a few centimeters long. There is a basal rosette of small, thick leaves and a few along the stems. The inflorescence is a dense cluster of sepals and four white to pink round petals.

References

External links
Jepson Manual Treatment
Photo gallery

Montiaceae
Flora of California
Flora without expected TNC conservation status